Bjarnfreðarson is a 2009 Icelandic comedy film directed by Ragnar Bragason, director of the TV series trilogy consisting of Næturvaktin, Dagvaktin and Fangavaktin, to which it is a sequel.  At its première in Iceland, it was met with wide success, even beating Avatar at the box office on its opening weekend. It was watched by over 20% of the Icelandic population, which is a record for an Icelandic film, and won 11 Edda Awards.

References

External links
 

2009 films
2000s Icelandic-language films
Films directed by Ragnar Bragason
2009 comedy films
Icelandic comedy films